Ethinab Rakhain is a Bangladesh Awami League politician and the former Member of the Bangladesh Parliament from a reserved seat.

Career
Rahman was elected to parliament from reserved seat in Cox's Bazar as a Bangladesh Awami League candidate in 2008.

References

Awami League politicians
Living people
Women members of the Jatiya Sangsad
9th Jatiya Sangsad members
21st-century Bangladeshi women politicians
21st-century Bangladeshi politicians
Year of birth missing (living people)